Marco Geisler (born 18 January 1974, in Cottbus) is a German rower.

References

External links
 

1974 births
Living people
Sportspeople from Cottbus
Rowers at the 2000 Summer Olympics
Rowers at the 2004 Summer Olympics
Olympic bronze medalists for Germany
Olympic rowers of Germany
Olympic medalists in rowing
German male rowers
World Rowing Championships medalists for Germany
Medalists at the 2000 Summer Olympics